The 2014 Southern Illinois Salukis football team represented Southern Illinois University Carbondale as a member of the Missouri Valley Football Conference (MVFC) during the 2014 NCAA Division I FCS football season. Led by seventh-year head coach Dale Lennon, the Salukis compiled an overall record of 6–6 with a mark of 3–5 in conference play, tying for seventh place in the MVFC. Southern Illinois played home games at Saluki Stadium in Carbondale, Illinois.

Schedule

Game summaries

Southeast Missouri State

Ranking movements

References

Southern Illinois
Southern Illinois Salukis football seasons
Southern Illinois Salukis football